The Carol I National Defence University is an institution of higher education, located in Bucharest, Romania. It was established in 1889 by Ștefan Fălcoianu under the name Higher War School. In 2005, it was renamed in honor of the Romanian King Carol I. The universities motto is "Great labor overcomes everything."

The Carol I National Defence University seeks to train military and civilian experts in security and national defense. It undertakes scientific studies related to these matters when requested by relevant state authorities. The university is a member of the International Association for Military Pedagogy (IAMP), whose members include military and civilian professionals from military institutions of advanced learning.

The main building of the University, built in 1937–1939, was designed by architect Duiliu Marcu. It is located at 68-72 Șoseaua Panduri, Sector 5.

References

External links
Official website

Educational institutions established in 1889
Carol I National Defence University
1889 establishments in Romania
Military academies of Romania